An integral lighthouse is a lighthouse in which the tower and keeper's dwelling are united in one structure.  Generally, the term is not used to refer to a caisson or screw-pile lighthouse.

References

Lighthouses